Jochen Borchert (born 25 April 1940 in Nahrstedt, Stendal) is a German politician and member of the CDU. He was minister of Food, Agriculture and Consumer Protection in Chancellor Helmut Kohl's cabinet from 1993 to 1998. From 1980 to 2009 he was a member of the Bundestag.

References

External links 
 Jochen Borchert's website
 Biography by German Bundestag

1940 births
Living people
Agriculture ministers of Germany
Members of the Bundestag for North Rhine-Westphalia
People from Stendal
German hunters
Commanders Crosses of the Order of Merit of the Federal Republic of Germany
Members of the Bundestag 2005–2009
Members of the Bundestag 2002–2005
Members of the Bundestag 1998–2002
Members of the Bundestag 1994–1998
Members of the Bundestag 1990–1994
Members of the Bundestag 1987–1990
Members of the Bundestag 1983–1987
Members of the Bundestag 1980–1983
Members of the Bundestag for the Christian Democratic Union of Germany